Scorpion (Carmilla Black, born Thasanee Rappaccini) is a fictional character appearing in American comic books published by Marvel Comics. She first appears in Amazing Fantasy (vol. 2) #7 and was created by Fred Van Lente and Leonard Kirk.

Fictional character biography
After the vicious murder of her adoptive parents, Carmilla discovered her biological mother, Monica Rappaccini, was the Scientist Supreme of the worldwide terrorist network A.I.M. (Advanced Idea Mechanics). Carmilla tried to find her real mother under the auspices of S.H.I.E.L.D., who attempted to use her to infiltrate A.I.M. She appears in Incredible Hulk #87, a one-shot story that takes place immediately after "House of M". Peter David, who wrote her appearances in Hulk, made suggestions that Bruce Banner may be her biological father.

Captain Universe
Carmilla and her S.H.I.E.L.D. handler, agent Derek Khanata, were sent to New York under orders to track down and capture the Uni-Power before it could fall into the hands of the terrorist organization A.I.M. Watching over the spot where a Captain Universe-empowered Daredevil fought four Class Three A.I.M. Commandos, Scorpion and Khanata waited to see if A.I.M. (who was also at the site) would find anything. A group of kids interrupted the A.I.M. Agents work and were nearly killed until Laura Kinney a.k.a. X-23 stepped in. The A.I.M. Commandos who fought Daredevil before begin to assault X-23 when she becomes Captain Universe. Scorpion entered the fray, helping X-23/Captain Universe defeat the Commandos. Soon afterwards X-23 began to search for a hidden base. Scorpion joined her so that she could capture Captain Universe and get the information on it from A.I.M., however X-23 convinced Scorpion to see the light and let Captain Universe go. X-23 took Captain Universe to a safe hiding place while Scorpion brought an A.I.M. scientist back to S.H.I.E.L.D. for interrogation.

Civil War/The Initiative 
Carmilla has been identified as one of the 142 registered superheroes who appear on the cover of the comic book Avengers: The Initiative #1.

In Spider-Man Family #3 (set prior to Civil War: Choosing Sides #1), she appears in a short story again written by Van Lente and drawn by Leonard Kirk. Here, she is infiltrating the unregistered superhero underground for S.H.I.E.L.D. and is sent on missions to establish a presence as a superhero. When the then-current Venom and former Scorpion Mac Gargan finds out about her, he challenges her to a fight, since he is negotiating for a movie based on his life story and does not want her diluting his trademark. She defeats him by absorbing some of his webbing, creating a "neo-symbiote" which disintegrates after she has defeated him.

World War Hulk
Carmilla is seen trying to aid S.H.I.E.L.D. upon the Hulk's return. When she finally got to battle the Hulk, she filled his body with a S.H.I.E.L.D.-devised poison concoction specially designed to kill him, but the sole effect was to cause boils to erupt on his skin. The Hulk's healing factor returned him to normal after just a few minutes, after which he was prompted to a sudden rush of anger by Amadeus Cho. Cho reveals to her the relationship her mother and the Hulk had back when they were in college. Cho asks her if she thought about the origins of her green hair. Carmilla attacks a S.H.I.E.L.D. truck transporting Bruce Banner to his underground prison, destroying the truck and knocking out both agents. Intending to get a DNA sample from Banner, she opens his casket, only to discover it was one of three decoys.

Dark Reign
It is revealed that Carmilla is now Hardball's lover and is the co-leader of the HYDRA Training Facility in Madripoor that the Shadow Initiative is supposed to be taking out. Carmilla and Hardball confront the Shadow Initiative, along with an army of HYDRA agents, shortly after learning they were searching for Hardball and have them pinned down in an old alleyway somewhere deep within the slums of Madripoor. It is later revealed that she was actually working undercover for an unknown source, implied to be Nick Fury. She convinces Hardball to turn himself in and escapes, but not before secretly stealing his S.P.I.N. Tech dart while kissing him.

The Gauntlet and Grim Hunt
Carmilla appears in a new costume during The Gauntlet and Grim Hunt storyline. She reveals that after quitting S.H.I.E.L.D., she began taking independent contracts. She was hired by Kraven the Hunter's family to steal Mac Gargan's original costume from the Hood (who had received the costume from Norman Osborn), who is planning to give the Scorpion costume to any low-level crook that impresses him. The Scorpion stings Spider-Man and he temporarily loses his powers. She then proceeds to fight the Hood and his allies and is quickly overwhelmed. However, Spider-Man regains his powers and saves her. She then delivers the suit to Sasha and Ana.

Powers and abilities
Genetically designed by her "mother" as part of a group of similar children called the Wakers that were designed to be immune against environmental toxins, the Scorpion mutated - greatly heightening her comparative abilities and equipping her with a left arm that allows her to release filtered toxins at will.

Her lymphatic system produces a "ludicrous" variety of life-saving chemicals, for example, atropine to defend against nerve gas or amyl to overcome blood agents like cyanide. Her sweat glands excrete dimercaprol and chloramine to counteract blistering agents such as mustard gas. Her cell nuclei float in a solution of iodized salt to deflect gamma rays and other radiation. Like activated charcoal, the cilia lining the Scorpion's trachea are highly adsorptive, neutralizing harmful particles before they reach the lungs. The axillary node in her left armpit is unusually swollen. Toxins seem to be accumulating there, to be released along the arm and hand. Since lymph fluid absorbs the chemicals, in fights this is highly dangerous. This absorption ability is potent enough to assimilate even the toxins that compose the Venom symbiote; in contact with her, the symbiote fled, fearing that she may be capable of truly destroying it.

Essentially, her unique body chemistry makes her immune to most types of poisons and unhealthy chemicals, gases, radiation (in fact, she can absorb and possibly gain nutrients from all three of these) and diseases. She is even capable of overcoming poisons designed to be allowed in by the other members of the Wakers, and in fact the mind controlling chemicals meant to make her loyal to her mother's agenda were what she originally absorbed and accidentally used to kill her boyfriend. She is physically gifted, since her body's chemistry keeps her in top physical shape, regardless of what she ingests.

Originally her power is uncontrolled and results in her boyfriend's death at their high school prom. But after three years, she has gotten relative control over it and can alter the strength of her poisonous touch from merely making people sick to knocking someone out or killing them. She also gained nearly indestructible mind controlled gauntlets packed full of S.H.I.E.L.D. technology and a body suit that manages to stop most, if not all, weapons and has other built-in gadgets.

Since Madripoor, she has added a tail (similar to that of Mac Gargan, the original Scorpion) to her costume with a stinger that injects S.P.I.N. tech nanites after ingesting the contents of the dart that she stole from Hardball. The effects only last half an hour. Since she has said that the source of the nanites is her own body, it is hinted that, unlike the original Scorpion, her tail may be semi-organic (Gargan's is mechanical).

There is also evidence that she may have honed her skills as a thief in the three years she spent on the street.

Other versions
In the House of M reality, the Scorpion was raised by her mother, and has a good relationship with her (as she was never adopted, she also goes by her birth name of Thasanee Rappaccini, although she retains the Scorpion codename). She is thus an agent of the semi-heroic A.I.M. and helped recruit the Hulk, her mother's former lover, to overthrow Exodus' totalitarian Australian government.

Behind the scenes
 The name Rappaccini is an allusion to the short story "Rappaccini's Daughter" by Nathaniel Hawthorne.  The title character of that story is a beautiful young woman whose breath and touch have been rendered poisonous by the experiments of her father.
 The Scorpion was originally intended to be the daughter of the Silver Samurai and the Viper, thus explaining Carmilla's hair color.

In other media
Carmilla appears in M.O.D.O.K., voiced by Zara Mizrahi. This version is identified as Carmilla Rappaccini and is the result of Monica inseminating herself with a male clone of herself named Manica, though Carmilla takes no interest in her mother's habits. Carmilla first appears in the episode "If Saturday Be... For the Boys!", where she bonds with and seemingly takes an interest in MODOK's son Lou, before making subsequent appearances in the episodes "What Menace Doth the Mailman Deliver!" and "Days of Future M.O.D.O.K.s".

Collected editions

References

External links
 
 

Comics characters introduced in 2005
Fictional genetically engineered characters
Fictional secret agents and spies
Hydra (comics) agents
Italian superheroes
Marvel Comics martial artists
Marvel Comics mutates
Marvel Next
Characters created by Fred Van Lente
Marvel Comics female superheroes

cs:Scorpion
sv:Scorpion